Brachymelecta is a genus of digger-cuckoo bees in the family Apidae, formerly (until 2021) known by the name Xeromelecta.

Species
 Brachymelecta alayoi Michener, 1988
 Brachymelecta californica (Cresson, 1878)
 Brachymelecta haitensis (Michener, 1948)
 Brachymelecta interrupta (Cresson, 1872)
 Brachymelecta larreae (Cockerell, 1900)
 Brachymelecta tibialis (Fabricius, 1793)

References

Further reading

External links

 

Apinae
Articles created by Qbugbot